Eric Knightley Chetwode Hamilton  (189021 May 1962) was an Anglican bishop.

He was born in 1890 and educated at Bradfield School and University College, Oxford. He was the youngest of the four adult sons of Charles Hamilton, sometime rector of Broome, Worcestershire; Charles' second son, Crewe (later a canon of St Albans), was ordained both times with his brother. They were made deacons on the Feast of St Thomas (21 December) 1913 and ordained priests on 20 December 1914; both times by Arthur Winnington-Ingram, Bishop of London, at St Paul's Cathedral. He was later priest in charge of St John's, Knightsbridge, vicar of St Nicholas Church, Chiswick and then of St Paul's, Knightsbridge before being appointed Bishop suffragan of Shrewsbury in 1940. He was consecrated a bishop on the feast of the Conversion of Paul (25 January) 1940, by Cosmo Lang, Archbishop of Canterbury, at Westminster Abbey. Four years later he was appointed Dean of Windsor. 

A man committed to the worldwide church who "took the very greatest and most conscientious of pains", he died in office as Dean of Windsor on 21 May 1962.

References

1890 births
People educated at Bradfield College
Alumni of University College, Oxford
20th-century Church of England bishops
Anglican bishops of Shrewsbury
Knights Commander of the Royal Victorian Order
Deans of Windsor
1962 deaths